Azuragrion nigridorsum, the black-tailed bluet or sailing bluet, is a species of damselfly in family Coenagrionidae.

Distribution and status
A common and widespread species with a range that extends from South Africa to Angola, Ethiopia, Oman, Yemen, Socotra, and Madagascar.

Habitat
This damselfly is found in a wide variety of habitats including slow-flowing streams and ponds; both open and partly shaded habitats are used.

Gallery

References

External links

 Azuragrion nigridorsum on African Dragonflies and Damselflies Online
 Illustration (watercolour) by Sélys

Coenagrionidae
Insects described in 1876
Taxonomy articles created by Polbot